Susannah Fowler (31 July 1847 – 1897), known by her stage name Emily Fowler, was an English actress, singer and theatre manager. Beginning in musical burlesques, she later played in contemporary drama and English classics. Although she was well-known on the London stage from 1869 to 1881, she is probably best remembered today for creating roles in three of W. S. Gilbert's early works.

Early life and career
Fowler was born in Rochdale, the daughter of a cabinet-maker, Samuel Matthew Fowler, and his wife Sophia née Fox. She took her stage name, Emily, in honor of her grandmother. She had three siblings, Clarissa, Sophia and Samuel. Her family moved to London before 1860, when her father died. As a teen, Fowler appeared in music hall.

In 1867, she joined the Royalty Theatre as a chorister and was soon made a replacement in the breeches role of Gnatbrain in F. C. Burnand's long-running musical burlesque of Black-Eyed Susan. The same year she married John Frederick Fenner, a chorister at the Royalty. The union did not last long, and both parties later married bigamously; he died in 1877. She soon created another burlesque breeches role at the Royalty, Florestein, in W. S. Gilbert's The Merry Zingara (1868).

Peak career
In 1869, at the Gaiety Theatre, she created the role of Alice in Gilbert's Robert the Devil (1869) and also played Butts (a maid) in the companion piece, a play, On the Cards. There she also originated the roles of Paraquita ("Queen of Kokatouka") in Columbus (1869). Now aged 22, Fowler took over the management of the Charing Cross Theatre for the 1869–1870 season. There she played Mephistopheles in a new burlesque, Very Little Faust and More Mephistopheles (1869) and starred as the hero, Hassan, in a burlesque by Arthur O'Neil of Arabian Knights and several more plays and burlesques, some by Wybert Reeve. The theatre historian Kurt Gänzl speculates that Reeve was Fowler's financial backer. She also originated the leading part of Hans in the last piece of the season, The Gentleman in Black, a comic opera written in 1870, with a libretto by W. S. Gilbert and music by Frederic Clay.

Later in 1870 she played in Free Labour by Charles Reade at the Adelphi Theatre and at Christmas, she starred at the Olympic Theatre as Prince Lardi Dardi in a pantomime of The White Cat. She began to build a reputation in drama playing, for example, Kate Bertram in The Rights of Woman. In 1871, she toured with Henry Neville in Dion Boucicault's Elfie, playing Rosie Aircastle and Sam Willoughby in The Ticket-of-Leave Man. In 1872 she was Alfonzo in a burlesque of Zampa at the Royal Court Theatre.

With Neville's company in 1873 at the Olympic, she played Florence in Mystery, Kate in Sour Grapes, Martha Gibbs in All That Glitters and Suzanne in The School for Intrigue, an adaptation of The Marriage of Figaro. The next season at the Olympic, she was Lady Betty Noel in Lady Clancarty by Tom Taylor and Beatrice in Much Ado About Nothing.  Rutland Barrington, who appeared with Fowler in Lady Clancarty, called her "one of the most delightful soubrettes that ever graced the stage".  In 1875 she played Deborah in The Spendthrift and May Edwards, the heroine, in The Ticket-of-Leave Man. She also portrayed Louise in The Two Orphans at the Olympic. Around this time Fowler wed John Callin Pemberton, the son of the actress Amy Sedgwick. She had never divorced her husband, however, and the marriage ended in 1879 on the grounds of illegality.

At the Queen's Theatre in 1876, she was Princess Katherine in Henry V. This was followed by a season at the St James's Theatre. In 1878, she played the title role in W. G. Wills's Nell Gwynne under her own management at the Royalty, and the Viscountess Lidesdale in Scandal at the same theatre, followed by Perdita in A Winter's Tale at the Theatre Royal, Drury Lane. At the Haymarket Theatre in 1879 she played in Ellen; or Love's Cunning. That year she also appeared in The Gay Deceivers at the Royalty. She also toured during this period and played in As You Like It with Neville.

Last years
Fowler married a third time, in 1880, to a Captain (later Major) Walter Latham Cox, who appears to have been quartered in Oxfordshire for a time. In 1881 she joined Henry Irving's company to play Emily de L'Esparre in a revival of The Corsican Brothers at the Lyceum Theatre. Then, for more than a decade Fowler disappeared from the London stage. She seems to have been in China, from where she returned to Britain in 1894 to play Lady Winifred Skipton in An Aristocratic Alliance, an adaptation of Le Gendre de M. Poirier, at the Criterion Theatre for Charles Wyndham. She is not known to have returned to the stage.

She died in Shoreditch in the June quarter, 1897, around her 50th birthday.

Notes

References
Clippings about Fowler at Footlightnotes.com
Photograph of Fowler

English musical theatre actresses
19th-century British women singers
People associated with Gilbert and Sullivan
1847 births
1896 deaths
19th-century English actresses